Sun Tiantian and Yan Zi were the defending champions, but Yan chose not to participate, and only Sun competed that year.
Sun partnered with Vania King, but lost in the semifinals to Aiko Nakamura and Ayumi Morita.

Jill Craybas and Marina Erakovic won in the final 4–6, 7–5, [10–6], against Aiko Nakamura and Ayumi Morita.

Seeds

Draw

Draw

External links
Draw

2008 Japan Open Tennis Championships